DRUM is a South African online family magazine mainly aimed at black readers containing market news, entertainment and feature articles. It has two sister magazines: Huisgenoot (aimed at White and Coloured Afrikaans-speaking readers) and YOU (aimed at demographically diverse South African English-speaking readers of different ethnicities to inform, inspire and entertain them by offering its own brand of coverage on current events and interesting people).

In 2005 it was described as "the first black lifestyle magazine in Africa", but it is noted chiefly for its early 1950s and 1960s reportage of township life under apartheid. From July 2020 the magazine became an online magazine.

History
Drum was started in 1951, as African Drum by former test cricketer and author Bob Crisp and Jim Bailey an ex-R.A.F. pilot, son of South African financier Sir Abe Bailey.

Initially under Crisp's editorship, the magazine had a paternalistic, tribal representation of Africans, but within a short time Crisp was replaced and the emphasis moved to the vibrant urban black townships.

The paper in its early years had a series of outstanding editors:
 Anthony Sampson, 1951–55
 Sylvester Stein, 1955–58
 Sir Tom Hopkinson, 1958–?

Both Sampson and Stein wrote books about their times as editor, Drum: A Venture into the New Africa (1956, republished in 2005 as Drum: the making of a magazine) and Who Killed Mr Drum? (1999) respectively.

Drum'''s heyday in the 1950s fell between the Defiance Campaign and the tragedy at Sharpeville. This was the decade of potential Black emergence, the decade when the Freedom Charter was written and the decade when the ANC alliance launched the Defiance Campaign. The aim was to promote an equal society. The Nationalist government responded with apartheid crackdowns and treason trials.

It was also the decade of the movement to the cities, of Sophiatown, of Black Jazz, the jazz opera King Kong with a Black cast, an adoption of American culture, of shebeens (illegal drinking dens) and flamboyant American style gangsters (tsotsis) with chrome-laden American cars who spoke a slang called Tsotsitaal.

It was a time of optimism and hope. DRUM was a "record of naivety, optimism, frustration, defiance, courage, dancing, drink, jazz, gangsters, exile and death".DRUM described the world of the urban Black; the culture, the colour, dreams, ambitions, hopes and struggles. Lewis Nkosi described DRUM's young writers as "the new African[s] cut adrift from the tribal reserve – urbanised, eager, fast-talking and brash."

Peter Magubane described the atmosphere in the newsroom. "DRUM was a different home; it did not have apartheid. There was no discrimination in the offices of DRUM magazine. It was only when you left DRUM and entered the world outside of the main door that you knew you were in apartheid land. But while you were inside DRUM magazine, everyone there was a family."DRUM′s cast of black journalists included Henry ("Mr DRUM") Nxumalo, Can Themba, Todd Matshikiza, Nat Nakasa, Lewis Nkosi and others such as William "Bloke" Modisane, Arthur Maimane, Stan Motjuwadi and Casey Motsisi. Together, they were known as "the DRUM Boys". This group lived by the dictum "live fast, die young and have a good-looking corpse". Most of these journalists went on to publish works in their own right. The other journalists who worked there include Bessie Head, Lionel Ngakane, Richard Rive and Jenny Joseph.

It was not only the writers–the pictures were also important. The main photographer and artistic director was Jürgen Schadeberg, who arrived in South Africa in 1950 after leaving a war-ravaged Berlin. He became one of the rare European photographers to photograph the daily lives of Black people. He trained a generation of rising black photographers, including Ernest Cole, Bob Gosani and later Peter Magubane. Magubane joined DRUM because "they were dealing with social issues that affected black people in South Africa. I wanted to be part of that magazine". Alf Khumalo was another well-known photographer on the staff.

Henry Nxumalo was the first journalist and specialised in investigative reporting. For example, he got a job on a potato farm where he exposed the exploitative conditions (almost slave-like) under which the Black labourers worked. In 1957, Nxumalo was murdered while investigating an abortion racket. His story was the basis for the 2004 film Drum.

Todd Matshikiza wrote witty and informed jazz articles about the burgeoning township jazz scene.

Dolly (the agony aunt) helped many a confused, young lover to get their lives back on course. The "Dear Dolly" letters were written by Dolly Rathebe, a popular actress, pin-up and singer. In reality, they were ghosted by other DRUM writers, notably Casey Motsisi.

Arthur Maimane, under the pseudonym Arthur Mogale, wrote a regular series entitled "The Chief" where he described gangster incidents he had heard about in the shebeens. Don Mattera, a leading Sophiatown gangster, took exception to this. "The gangsters were pissed off with him and there was a word out that we should wipe this guy off."

The office telephonist, David Sibeko, became leader of the Pan-African Congress.DRUM also encouraged fiction. Es'kia Mphahlele (the fiction editor from 1955 to 1957) encouraged and guided this. During that time over 90 short stories were published by such authors as Todd Matshikiza, Bloke Modisane, Henry Nxumalo, Casey Motsisi, Arthur Maimane (alias Mogale), Lewis Nkosi, Nat Nakasa, Can Themba and others. These stories described the people of the street; jazz musicians, gangsters, shebeen queens and con men and were written in a uniquely Sophiatown-influenced blend of English and Tsotsitaal. This creative period has been called the Sophiatown renaissance.

The backbone of the magazine was crime, investigative reporting, sex (especially if across the colour line) and sport. This was fleshed out by imaginative photography.

The formula worked and made for compulsive reading. Each issue of DRUM was read by up to 9 people, passed from hand to hand on the streets, in the clubs or on the trains. It became a symbol of Black urban life. 240,000 copies were distributed each month across Africa. This was more than any other African magazine.DRUM was distributed in 8 different countries: Union of South Africa, Central African Federation, Kenya, Tanganyika, Uganda, Ghana, Nigeria and Sierra Leone.

Sadly, because of the immovable force of apartheid the promise and dreams it described turned to frustration and despair. In 1955 Sophiatown was bulldozed and the writers died or went overseas, and "...The creative output of the Sophiatown Renaissance came to an end as the bulldozers rolled in...."

Later ownership
By May 1965 DRUM had faded and became simply a fortnightly supplement to the Golden City Post, another Bailey property. It was revived in 1968. In 1984 Naspers acquired DRUM Publications, the publisher of City Press, DRUM and True Love & Family.

The parent company of the magazine is Media24 which announced in July 2020 that the print version of the magazine ceased publication due to the COVID-19 pandemic.

See also
 Darren Newbury, Defiant Images: Photography and Apartheid South Africa, University of South Africa (UNISA) Press, 2009,  (see Chapter 2, "A fine thing": The African DRUM, and Chapter 3, "Johannesburg lunch-hour": photographic humanism and the social vision of DRUM)
 Michael Chapman (ed.), The DRUM Decade: stories from the 1950s, University of Natal Press, 2001, 
 Dorothy C. Woodson, DRUM: an index to Africa's leading magazine, 1951–1965, University of Wisconsin-Madison, African Studies Programme, 1988, 
 Heyns, Jacky, The Beat of DRUM: the story of a magazine that documented the rise of Africa as told by DRUM's publisher, editors, contributors, and photographers, Ravan Press, 1982–1984.  (the full set),  (vol. 1)
 The Beat of DRUM. Vol. 4, The Bedside Book: Africa's leading magazine, editor in chief J. R. A. Bailey, editor H. Lunn, James R. A. Bailey, 1984, 
 DRUM: South Africa's Black picture magazine, Creative Camera, 1984
 Anthony Sampson, DRUM: the making of a magazine, Jonathan Ball Publishers, 
 Anthony Sampson, DRUM, Hodder & Stoughton, 1983, 
 Mike Nicol, Good-looking Corpse: World of DRUM – Jazz and Gangsters, Hope and Defiance in the Townships of South Africa, Secker & Warburg, 1991, 
 Sylvester Stein (with a foreword by Anthony Sampson), Who Killed Mr DRUM?, Mayibuye Books, 1999, 
 1952 Time magazine article, "South African Drumbeats"
 1959 Time magazine article, "Drum Beat in Africa"
 Drum (2004), a film about Drum magazine and one of its journalists, Henry Nxumalo
 Come Back, Africa, a film shot in Sophiatown in the 1950s with writing credits by Lionel Rogosin, Bloke Modisane and Lewis Nkosi.
 Have You Seen Drum Recently?, a film by Jürgen Schadeberg]using photographs drawn from the DRUM archives.
 Lionel Rogosin & Peter Davis, Come Back, Africa''. STE Publishers,  (The book of the film).

References

External links
 
 Drum 1976–1980 – An exhibition from the pages of Drum magazine
 SA history page on Drum
 Drum magazine article at Worldonline

1951 establishments in South Africa
2020 disestablishments in South Africa
Anti-Apartheid organisations
Defunct magazines published in South Africa
Lifestyle magazines
Magazines established in 1951
Magazines disestablished in 2020
Mass media in Johannesburg
Newspaper supplements
Online magazines with defunct print editions